Abelardo Ríos Osorio (born 20 January 1952) is a Colombian former professional racing cyclist. He rode in two editions of the Tour de France and one edition of the Giro d'Italia. He also competed in the individual road race at the 1976 Summer Olympics.

Major results

1971
 4th Overall Clásico RCN
1st Young rider classification
1972
 4th Overall Clásico RCN
1973
 1st Stage 7 Vuelta a Colombia
 9th Overall Tour de l'Avenir
1974
 3rd Overall Clásico RCN
1st Stage 3
 3rd Overall Vuelta a Antioquia
1975
 2nd Overall Clásico RCN
 3rd Road race, National Road Championships
1976
 1st  Overall Vuelta a Antioquia
1st Stages 4 & 6
1st Points classification
1st Combination classification
 2nd Overall Vuelta a Cuba
1st Mountains classification
1st Stage 5
 9th Overall Vuelta a Colombia
1st Stage 4
1977
 1st  Road race, National Road Championships
 1st Overall Clásica Nacional Marco Fidel Suárez
1978
 1st  Overall Vuelta a Antioquia
 1st Stage 1 Clásico RCN
 1st Stage 1 Vuelta a Boyacá
1979
 1st Stage 6 Vuelta a Colombia
1981
 1st Stage 3 Vuelta a Colombia
 1st Stage 4 Clásico RCN
1982
 1st Overall Clásica de El Carmen de Viboral
1983
 9th Overall Vuelta a Colombia
1986
 1st Stage 1 Vuelta a Colombia
1987
 1st Stage 12 Vuelta a Colombia

Grand Tour general classification results timeline

Notes

References

External links
 

1952 births
Living people
Colombian male cyclists
Sportspeople from Antioquia Department
Olympic cyclists of Colombia
Cyclists at the 1976 Summer Olympics
Vuelta a Colombia stage winners
20th-century Colombian people